The 1934–35 Ranji Trophy was the inaugural season of the Ranji Trophy. It was contested between 15 teams in four zones in a knockout format. Bombay defeated Northern India in the final. The opening match, between Madras and Mysore, reached a result on the first day. The tournament was named as The Cricket Championship of India, onwards 1935-36 is renamed as Ranji trophy.

Highlights

 The first match of the competition was held on 4 November 1934 between Madras and Mysore at Chepauk. M. J. Gopalan of Madras bowled the first ball to N. Curtis.
 Madras won the match by an innings and 23 runs, five minutes before the close of play on the first day. As of 2022, this is the only first-class match in India to finish in a single day.
 S. M. Hadi of Hyderabad hit the first century in the Ranji Trophy. He scored 132* against Madras at Secunderabad.
 George Abell of Northern India scored the first double hundred, with 210 v Army. In the same innings, he was involved in a partnership of 304 with Ahmed Raza.
 Abell scored a century before lunch on the second day (24* to 128*), the first such instance in the Ranji Trophy.
 Baqa Jilani took a hat-trick for Northern India v Southern Punjab in the semifinal at Amritsar.
 Southern Punjab was all out for 22 in the same innings. This remained the lowest team total in the Ranji Trophy until Hyderabad was all out for 21 against Rajasthan in 2010–11.
 Madras was intended to be the venue of the semi-final between Bombay and Hyderabad, but it was moved to Bombay as the cricket association in Madras was not in a position to host it. Subsequently, Hyderabad declined to travel, meaning the semi-final was a walkover to Bombay.

Zonal Matches

South Zone

West Zone

North Zone

East Zone

Inter-Zonal Knockout Stage

Final

References

External links
 Series home at ESPN Cricinfo
 Scorecards and averages at Cricketarchive

1934 in Indian cricket
1935 in Indian cricket
Ranji Trophy seasons